Frank Alexander de Pass VC (26 April 1887 – 25 November 1914) was an English recipient of the Victoria Cross (VC), the highest and most prestigious award for gallantry in the face of the enemy that can be awarded to British and Commonwealth forces. He was the first Jew to receive the VC, and was the first officer of the Indian Army to receive the VC.

De Pass was born in Kensington to London merchant Sir Eliot de Pass and Beatrice de Mercado. The family's original surname, Shalom, was translated to the Spanish word for peace and became Paz before being anglicised to Pass when the family first settled in England in the 1660s.

He attended Rugby School. By the age of 27, he had attained the rank of Lieutenant in the 34th Prince Albert Victor's Own Poona Horse.

On 24 November 1914, de Pass entered a German sap near Festubert, France, and destroyed a traverse in the face of the enemy's bombs. He also rescued, under heavy fire, a wounded man who was lying exposed to enemy bullets in the open. The next day, de Pass was killed in a second attempt to capture the sap, which the enemy had re-occupied. He was posthumously awarded the Victoria Cross on 18 February 1915. His Victoria Cross is displayed at the National Army Museum in Chelsea, London.

His sister, Marjorie, married Sir Henry Kitson and had two sons, including Sir Frank Kitson.

In 2014, on the centennial of his death, de Pass was honoured with a memorial paving stone laid outside the Ministry of Defence in Whitehall, London. The ceremony was attended by his nephew, Col. Jonny Kitson, his great nephew Thomas Kitson and Sgt. Johnson Beharry VC, the first living recipient of the Victoria Cross in more than three decades.

See also
Darwan Singh Negi

References

 National Army Museum

Publications
Monuments to Courage (David Harvey, 1999)
The Register of the Victoria Cross (This England, 1997)
VCs of the First World War (Gerald Gliddon, 1994)

1887 births
1914 deaths
English people of Spanish-Jewish descent
British World War I recipients of the Victoria Cross
British Indian Army officers
British military personnel killed in World War I
People from Kensington
English Jews
People educated at Rugby School
Indian Army personnel killed in World War I
Jewish military personnel
Military personnel from Middlesex